Nils Rosenius was a Swedish figure skater who competed in pair skating. With partner Valborg Lindahl, he won the silver medal at the 1909 World Figure Skating Championships.

Competitive highlights 
With  Valborg Lindahl

References 

Swedish male pair skaters
Date of birth missing
Date of death missing